Cristiano is an Italian and Portuguese form of the male given name Christian, which usually refers to the Portuguese footballer Cristiano Ronaldo. 

Cristiano may also refer to:

See also
 Christianno, Brazilian footballer
 Christian (disambiguation)
 Cristiano (surname)

Masculine given names